Frederick Bartlett Fancher (April 2, 1852January 10, 1944) was an American politician who was the seventh Governor of North Dakota from 1899 to 1901.

Biography

Frederick B. Fancher was born in Orleans County, New York, on April 2, 1852. Educated in the public schools, he also attended Michigan State Normal School in Ypsilanti, Michigan. He married Florence S. Van Voorhies.

Career

Working in insurance in Illinois and North Dakota, Fancher first entered politics and was President of the North Dakota Constitutional Convention in 1889.  He had moved to North Dakota in 1881 and began a large farming operation near Jamestown. He was State Insurance Commissioner from 1895 to 1899 and a trustee board member of the State Hospital for the Insane.

Securing the Republican nomination, he was elected Governor and served from 1899 to January 10, 1901. While he was in that office, a state board of pardons, and a twine plant in the state penitentiary were established.

After leaving office, he moved to Sacramento, California and had a retail and wholesale grocery business until his retirement in 1925.

Death

Fancher died in Los Angeles, California, on January 10, 1944, at age 91. He is buried in East Lawn Memorial Park in Sacramento, California. He was the last surviving Governor to have served in the 19th century.

References

External links
Biography for Frederick Fancher from the State Historical Society of North Dakota website.

The Political Graveyard
National Governors Association
 Soylent Communications

1852 births
1944 deaths
Republican Party governors of North Dakota
American Protestants
19th-century American politicians
20th-century American politicians